Dil Jan Khan (Urdu: دل جان خان) (born November 11, 1934) is a former senior vice president of International Narcotics Control Board of the UN. Ethnically, he is a Marwat and was born in District Lakki Marwat of Pakistan. He joined Police Service of Pakistan on January 21, 1961. Dil Jan Khan has also worked as an Inspector General of Police and on a number of other important positions as Interior Secretary of Pakistan, Federal Secretary for State and Frontier Regions (SAFRON), and as commandant of the Frontier Constabulary.

His cousin Abdul Majeed Khan Marwat was also commandant FC (Frontier Constabulary) in Khyber Pakhtunkhwa.

Dil Jan Khan is currently the chairman of Dil Jan Foundation. Which was founded in 2005, with the sole purpose of alleviating the less fortunate.

Education and career 
 Bachelor of Arts
 Bachelor of Laws and Master of Arts in Political Science
 Chairman Dil Jan Foundation (2006 - )
 Honorary Advisor to the Ministry of Interior, Government of Pakistan)
 Secretary of the States and Frontier Regions Division of the Government of Pakistan (1990-1993)
 Secretary of the Interior Division of the Government of Pakistan (1990)
 Secretary of the Narcotics Control Division (1990 and 1993-1994) of the Government of Pakistan
 Commandant of the Frontier Constabulary, North-West Frontier Province (1978-1980 and 1982-1983)
 Inspector General of Police, North-West Frontier Province (1980-1982 and 1983-1986).
 Additional Secretary, Ministry of Interior of Pakistan (1986-1990).
 Counsellor (1973-1978) and First Secretary (1972), Embassy of Pakistan, Kabul.
 Recipient of Sitara-i-Basalat, one of the highest awards for gallantry, awarded by the President of Pakistan (1990).
 President of the International Club, Kabul.
 Dean of the Counsellor/Administration Corps, Afghanistan.
 Member of the Asian-African Legal Consultative Committee.
 President of the Police Service of Pakistan Association (1993-1994).
 Patron of the nongovernmental organization anti-narcotics society (1982-1983).
 Participant in the seminar on replacement of opium poppy cultivation, held in Bangkok (1978).
 Head of the delegation of Pakistan to the Executive Committee of the Office of the United Nations High Commissioner for Refugees (UNHCR) (1990-1993); the workshop of the UNHCR Asian-African Legal Consultative Committee (1991); the UNHCR meeting (1991); the Asian-African Legal Consultative Committee, New Delhi (1991); the World Food Programme Authority (1992); and the talks on relief assistance for Afghan refugees, Geneva and Washington, D.C. (1993). Head of the delegation of Pakistan to the Commission on Narcotic Drugs (1993 and 1994); the technical consultation between India and Pakistan, held in Vienna under the auspices of UNDCP, on cooperation in drug control activities (1994); and the First Policy-Level Meeting on Technical Cooperation between Pakistan and India (1994). Responsible for “Free Dispensary” for the treatment of poor patients, including drug addicts and child labourers, in rural areas (1999). Member of the International Narcotics Control Board (since 1995). Member of the Standing Committee on Estimates (since 1995). First Vice-President of the Board (1998). Chairman of the Committee on Finance and Administration (2000). Member of the Committee.

See also
 Bannu

References

External links
 UN.org
 UN document on International Narcotics Control Board

1934 births
Living people
Pashtun people
Pakistani civil servants
IGPs of Khyber Pakhtunkhwa Police